Grantley Evan Marshall (born 18 December 1959), also known by the stage name Daddy G, is a British DJ and a founding member of the band  Massive Attack.

Biography
Born in Bristol to West Indian parents, Marshall joined the Bristol music scene as a member of the sound system the Wild Bunch in the 1980s. The sound system included the other three founding members of Massive Attack, Robert del Naja, Adrian Thaws
and Andrew Vowles. At the time he was one of the youngest DJs in the city. In 1986, The Wild Bunch disbanded. Del Naja, Vowles, and Marshall then formed the trip hop group Massive Attack in 1988, which are considered to have pioneered the Bristol Sound along with Portishead and Tricky. 

Between 2001 and 2005, Marshall was mainly absent from Massive Attack, with 100th Window being the only album he did not have major input on. Reuniting (minus Vowles) for Heligoland and more recent projects, the group divided the production work between Marshall and Del Naja, who each worked on separate songs in their own studios, choosing their own collaborators.

Other work
Marshall mixed a CD for the DJ-Kicks mix series in 2004.

References

1959 births
Living people
Musicians from Bristol
Black British musicians
British trip hop musicians
English electronic musicians
English people of West Indian descent
English people of Barbadian descent
Massive Attack members
DJs_from_Bristol